Helaleh or Halaleh may refer to:
 Halaleh-ye Manzel
 Konar Helaleh